Der Wolf may refer to:

Der Wolf (rapper) (born 1973), German rapper
"Der Wolf" (song), a 2013 song by Julian Le Play